Orlando Corradi (1940, Busto Arsizio – 7 November 2018, Switzerland) was an Italian film director, animator, and film distributor. He was the co-founder, president, CEO and CFO of Mondo TV.

Career
Born in Busto Arsizio in 1940, Corradi (along with Kenichi Tominaga) founded DEA S.n.c. in 1964, a company active in the audiovisual animation sector, with the aim of acquiring the rights to Japanese animated cartoons for distribution in Italy and Europe. In 1979 and 1980, respectively, Corradi and Tominaga created the companies DORO TV Merchandising. for large-scale television networks, and Italian TV Broadcasting S.r.l., for smaller-size broadcaster. The period from the late 1970s to the early 1980s saw the rise in demand for Japanese animated cartoons and the growth of the Italian television market.  The two companies started distributing feature films, TV series and sports events. Mondo TV S.r.l. was founded in 1985 to produce animated cartoon series. Corradi died in Switzerland on November 7, 2018.

Personal life
He was married to Giuliana Bertozzi.

Filmography

As director
 The Jungle Book: Mowgli's Adventure (1990)
  King David (1997)
 The Legend of the Titanic (1999)
 The Prince of Dinosaurs (2000)
 In Search of the Titanic (2004)
 Mother Teresa (2004)
 Genghis Khan (2004)
 Padre Pio (2006, with Jang Chol Su)
 Saint Catherine (2006)
 Alexander the Great (2006)
 Karol (2007)
 Christmas in New York (2007)
 Welcome Back Pinocchio (2007)
 Ramses (2007)
 The Journey of J.M. Escrivá (2009)
 Virus Attack (2011)
 Gormiti Nature Unleashed (2012)
 Angel's Friends (2009)
 Angel's friends: Between dream and reality (2011)   * Puppy in My Pocket: Adventures in Pocketville (2010)
 Dinofroz (2006)

As Producer
Television Series

 Christopher Columbus (1990)
 The Story of Cinderella (1996)
 The Legend of Zorro (1996)
 Simba the King Lion (1996)
 Pocahontas (1996)
 Super Little Fanta Heroes (1997)
 Sandokan (1997-2006)
 The Black Corsair (1998-1999)
 Toy Toons (1999-2000)
 Bugs' Adventures (1999-2000)
 Simba Jr. Goes to N.Y. and the World Cup (1998)
 Letters from Felix (2003)
 The Last of the Mohicans (2004)
 Farhat: The Prince of the Desert (2004)
 Gladiators (2009)

References

Italian film directors
1940 births
2018 deaths